Stictocoris is a genus of true bugs belonging to the family Cicadellidae.

The species of this genus are found in Europe.

Species:
 Stictocoris hybneri Gmelin, 1789
 Stictocoris picturatus (C.Sahlberg, 1842)

References

Cicadellidae
Hemiptera genera